Borjelu (also Romanized as Borjelū; also known as Borūjelū) is a village in Yurchi-ye Gharbi Rural District, Kuraim District, Nir County, Ardabil Province, Iran. At the 2006 census, its population was 175, in 32 families.

References 

Towns and villages in Nir County